Flip Records may refer to:

 Flip Records (1950s)
 Flip Records (1994)

See also
 List of record labels